Jean F. Dubé (born 29 June 1962, in Campbellton, New Brunswick) was a Progressive Conservative member of the House of Commons of Canada from 1997 to 2000.

A career businessman, he is the son of Fernand Dubé who served for thirteen years in the Cabinet of New Brunswick Premier Richard Hatfield. He served as President of the Campbellton Regional Chamber of Commerce, President of the Campbellton Business Improvement Corporation, and was the founding President of the Bay of Chaleur Alzheimer Society.

Dubé was elected in the Madawaska—Restigouche electoral district in the 1997 general election. He served in the 36th Canadian Parliament until he was defeated by Liberal candidate Jeannot Castonguay in the 2000 election.

He won a 2001 New Brunswick provincial by-election in the Campbellton provincial riding, but lost to Liberal Roy Boudreau in the 2003 general provincial election.

In 2019, he became Executive Director of Maison House of Nazareth, a 105-bed emergency homeless shelter in Moncton, New Brunswick. Dubé stepped down from his association with the shelter after staffing shortages associated with the Covid-19 pandemic and other promised services for users of the facility could not be met.

Electoral history

References

 https://www.acadienouvelle.com/actualites/2021/05/07/maison-nazareth-conflit-dinterets-apparent-entre-le-ca-et-le-dg/

External links

1962 births
Living people
Members of the House of Commons of Canada from New Brunswick
People from Campbellton, New Brunswick
Progressive Conservative Party of New Brunswick MLAs
21st-century Canadian politicians